Hop and Go is a 1943 Warner Bros. Looney Tunes animated cartoon directed by Norman McCabe and animated by Cal Dalton. The short was released on March 27, 1943. It stars the voices of Pinto Colvig (Claude Hopper) and Mel Blanc (Scottish Rabbits and baby bird).

Home media
Looney Tunes Golden Collection: Volume 6 presents this cartoon as a bonus cartoon on Disc 2, uncut but not digitally remastered. The cartoon uses an unreleased stereo mix of its soundtrack. Note that some of the character dialogue's volume has been decreased, making it hard for viewers to understand the lines the characters say.

References

External links

1943 films
1943 animated films
1940s American animated films
1940s animated short films
Looney Tunes shorts
Films scored by Carl Stalling
Films directed by Norman McCabe
Films produced by Leon Schlesinger
American black-and-white films
Animated films about kangaroos and wallabies
Animated films about rabbits and hares